The 2008 European Athletics Indoor Cup was held on 16 February 2008 at the CSKA Universal Sports Hall in Moscow, Russia. It was the fourth and final edition of the indoor track and field meeting for international teams, which featured the six top performing nations from the 2007 European Cup and the top two from the European Cup First League. Great Britain and Northern Ireland did not send either a men's or women's team and they were replaced by Ukraine and Spain, respectively. The men's team from Greece also opted not to participate and they were replaced by Sweden (the third best finisher in the 2007 European A League). The host nation won both the men's and women's competitions.

The competition featured nineteen athletics events, nine for men and ten for women. The 400 metres race were held in a dual final format due to size constraints, with athletes' being assigned final positions through their finishing times. The international team points totals were decided by their athletes' finishing positions, with each representative's performance contributing towards their national overall score.

Russia came first the men's competition, winning five of the nine events and having eighteen points to spare over second-placed Spain. Yevgeniy Borisov was one of the team's best performers as he won the 60 metres hurdles in a Russian record time of 7.44 seconds. The Russian women's team was even more dominant than their male counterparts as the team went on to continue their undefeated streak, winning six of the ten women's events and finishing 24 points clear of the runner-up Germany.

The French women became the first team to finish the competition without winning a single event, although their points total of 23 was one higher than the record low (Sweden in 2006).

Results summary

Men

Women

Medal table
Key

References

Results
2008 European Athletics Indoor Cup - Men's Results. European Athletics. Retrieved on 2011-01-28.
2008 European Athletics Indoor Cup - Women's Results. European Athletics. Retrieved on 2011-01-28.
2008 European Athletics Indoor Cup - Summary. Tilastopaja. Retrieved on 2011-01-28.

External links
Official EAA competition website
Official event technical manual
LOC website 

2008
European Indoor Cup
International athletics competitions hosted by Russia
Sports competitions in Moscow
February 2008 sports events in Europe
2008 in Moscow
2008 in Russian sport
Athletics in Moscow